Neville Smith may refer to:
Neville Smith (actor), British screenwriter and actor
Neville Smith (rugby league), Australian rugby league footballer